Club Deportivo Yeclano was a Spanish football team based in Yecla, in the autonomous community of Murcia. Founded in 1940, it began to play official competitions since 1943 at Estadio de La Constitución. It was promoted to Tercera Division in the 1952-53 campaign and the team was dissolved after the 1957-58 season.

Season to season

5 seasons in Tercera División
8 seasons in Primera Regional
1 season in Segunda Regional

References

External links
Arquero-arba
La Futbolteca. Enciclopedia del Fútbol Español
Futbol Regional (FRE)
Arefepedia - A.R.E.F.E.
Hemeroteca - Archivo Municipal de Murcia - Ayuntamiento de Murcia

Football clubs in Spain
Murcia